Béla Bácskai (25 April 1912 – 1994), also known as Béla Bogschütz, was a Hungarian field hockey player who competed in the 1936 Summer Olympics.

In 1936 he was a member of the Hungarian team which was eliminated in the group stage of the Olympic tournament. He played one match as back.

References

External links
 
 
 
 

1912 births
1994 deaths
Hungarian male field hockey players
Olympic field hockey players of Hungary
Field hockey players at the 1936 Summer Olympics